Yaya may refer to:

Places

Yaya, Çan
Yaya, Congo, district of Niari Department in the Republic of Congo
Yaya, Russia, an urban-type settlement in Kemerovo Oblast, Russia
Yaya (river), a river in Kemerovo Oblast, Russia
Yaya Island, Russia
La Yaya Dam, in Cuba
Yaya, DR Congo, district of Kwilu Province in the Democratic Republic of Congo
Yaya Mongombala, DR Congo, district of Kwilu Province in the Democratic Republic of Congo

People
Faouzi Yaya (born 1989), Algerian football player
Yaya DaCosta (born 1982), America's Next Top Model contestant
YaYa Gosselin (born 2009), American actress
Yaya Han (born 1980), American cosplayer
Yaya Migansi (c. 1850–1932), princess of Dahomey, present-day Benin
Yaya Sanogo (born 1993), French football player
Yaya Touré (born 1983), Ivorian football player
Urassaya Sperbund (Yaya; born 1993), Thai actress

Characters
Yaya, a 2009 fictional character from the light novel series Unbreakable Machine-Doll
Yaya Nanto, a character from the anime series Strawberry Panic
Yaya Yuiki, a character from the manga series Shugo Chara!
Yaya Dub, a character played by Maine Mendoza in a comedy segment called "Kalyeserye" in the Filipino noontime show Eat Bulaga!

Music
 "Yaya" (song), a 2020 single by 6ix9ine 
Ya Ya, a 1962 single by Lee Dorsey
Yaya, a 1982 album of Nino Buonocore

Other
Yaya (military), infantry military units of the Ottoman Empire and some other medieval Anatolian emirates
YaYa's Flame Broiled Chicken, an American fast food chicken chain

See also
Ya-ya (disambiguation)

cs:Jaja